Browns Creek Township is a township in Jewell County, Kansas, USA.  As of the 2000 census, its population was 64.

Geography
Browns Creek Township covers an area of 36.02 square miles (93.3 square kilometers); of this, 0.01 square miles (0.02 square kilometers) or 0.02 percent is water.

Adjacent townships
 Calvin Township (north)
 Buffalo Township (northeast)
 Prairie Township (east)
 Solomon Rapids Township, Mitchell County (south)
 Glen Elder Township, Mitchell County (southwest)
 Athens Township (west)
 Ionia Township (northwest)

Cemeteries
The township contains two cemeteries: Fairview and Union.

Major highways
 K-14

References
 U.S. Board on Geographic Names (GNIS)
 United States Census Bureau cartographic boundary files

External links
 US-Counties.com
 City-Data.com

Townships in Jewell County, Kansas
Townships in Kansas